Peter Dinsdale (19 October 1938 – 5 June 2004) was a football player and coach. He played 239 times for Huddersfield Town and was head coach of the Canadian national soccer team for qualifying for the 1970 FIFA World Cup.

Player
Born in Bradford, Dinsdale played for the Yorkshire Amateurs before turning professional with Huddersfield Town in January 1956. He cracked the first team in 1959 upon finishing his National Service. A forward early in his career, he made a switch left midfielder by 1962. He played with Town until 1966, making 219 league appearances for the side. Dinsdale was one of the first English players to play professionally in North America, joining the Vancouver Royals of the United Soccer Association (USA) for their inaugural 1967 (summer) season. The USA merged with the National Professional Soccer League (NPSL) to form the North American Soccer League (NASL). Dinsdale played with the Royals during the 1968 NASL season. There he was subject to one of the earliest football loan transfers, playing on loan from Vancouver with Bradford Park Avenue during the Canadian club's off-season. He made nine league appearances for the Bradford club.

Manager
After managing Canada between 1968 and 1970, Dinsdale returned to England to become assistant manager of Brighton and Hove Albion from 1970 to 1972 under former Huddersfield teammate Pat Saward. He later emigrated and settled in Vancouver, working as a real estate agent.

References

External links
 www.findarticles.com
 Vancouver Royals stats
 

1938 births
2004 deaths
Association football midfielders
Bradford (Park Avenue) A.F.C. players
Canada men's national soccer team managers
Huddersfield Town A.F.C. players
English footballers
English expatriate footballers
English football managers
English emigrants to Canada
Expatriate soccer managers in Canada
North American Soccer League (1968–1984) players
Soccer players from Vancouver
United Soccer Association players
Vancouver Royals players
Footballers from Bradford
English expatriate sportspeople in Canada
Expatriate soccer players in Canada